The Women's +75 kg weightlifting event took place on 30 July. The event took place at the Clyde Auditorium.

Result

References

Weightlifting at the 2014 Commonwealth Games
Common